Aliabad-e Garus (also Romanized as ‘Alīābād-e Garūs) is a village in Sahneh Rural District, in the Central District of Sahneh County, Kermanshah Province, Iran. At the 2006 census, its population was 108, in 23 families.

References 

Populated places in Sahneh County